The Dutty Moonshine Big Band are a British electronic dance music group. In June 2020, their second album, City of Sin, reached number 40 on the UK Albums Chart and number one on the UK Dance Albums Chart.

References

English electronic music groups
British electronic dance music groups
Musical groups from Bristol
Universal Music Group artists